Garfield Lake is a lake in Hubbard County, in the U.S. state of Minnesota.

The lake was named for James A. Garfield, 20th President of the United States.

See also
List of lakes in Minnesota

References

Lakes of Minnesota
Lakes of Hubbard County, Minnesota